Charles William Huddy (born June 2, 1959) is a Canadian former NHL defenceman and former assistant coach of the Winnipeg Jets. He is also one of only seven Edmonton Oilers to be a member of all 5 of the franchise's Stanley Cup-winning teams (1984, 1985, 1987, 1988 & 1990).

Biography
As a youth, he played in the 1972 Quebec International Pee-Wee Hockey Tournament with a minor ice hockey team from Dorset Park, Toronto.

His greatest success came with the Oilers with whom he played from the start of his career in the 1980–81 season until the end of the 1990–91 season.  He would tally 368 points in 694 regular season games, and 77 points in 138 playoff games. In 1983, Huddy won the NHL's first Plus/Minus Award, presented annually to the player who (in at least sixty games) leads the NHL in Plus/Minus statistics.

After he left Edmonton, Huddy would play four seasons with the Los Angeles Kings, which included former Oilers, Wayne Gretzky, Jari Kurri, Marty McSorley, and Paul Coffey. He played an important role in LA's march to the 1993 Stanley Cup Finals. Huddy would later finish his career with the St. Louis Blues and Buffalo Sabres, eventually retiring after the 1996–97 campaign.

He previously held an assistant coaching position with the New York Rangers, and was the head coach of the ECHL Huntington Blizzard.  Charlie was relieved of his duties for the Edmonton Oilers as an assistant coach with the personnel changes that took place on May 26, 2009. He was subsequently an assistant coach with the Dallas Stars, but was let go on June 24, 2011.  Huddy was hired as the new assistant coach of the Winnipeg Jets on July 8, 2011.

Awards and achievements
1982-83 - NHL Plus/Minus Award

Career statistics

Regular season and playoffs

International

See also
List of NHL players with 1000 games played

References

External links

Oiler's bio

1959 births
Living people
Buffalo Sabres players
Canadian ice hockey defencemen
Dallas Stars coaches
ECHL coaches
Edmonton Oilers coaches
Edmonton Oilers players
Houston Apollos players
Ice hockey people from Ontario
Los Angeles Kings players
New York Rangers coaches
Oshawa Generals players
Rochester Americans players
St. Louis Blues players
Sportspeople from Oshawa
Stanley Cup champions
Undrafted National Hockey League players
Wichita Wind players
Winnipeg Jets coaches
Canadian ice hockey coaches